Jeffrey Spencer (born April 14, 1951) is a former American cyclist. He competed in the sprint and tandem events at the 1972 Summer Olympics.

References

External links
 

1951 births
Living people
American male cyclists
Olympic cyclists of the United States
Cyclists at the 1972 Summer Olympics
Cyclists from Los Angeles